Ministry of Justice is a governmental body in the Sultanate of Oman. Established in 1970, the ministry is distinct from the Ministry of Legal Affairs and has the following objectives:

 Developing the judicial system, qualifying and training judges so as to achieve superseding justice
 Strengthening judicial ethics and enhancing its systems
 Carry out judicial inspection in accordance with the judicial inspection regulation
 Organizing the administrative and financial affairs of courts and supervising them
 Regulating Expertise procedures in accordance with the laws
 Regulating and managing the work of the notary public
 Supervising lawyers’ affairs in accordance with the applied rules and regulations
 Preparing and issuing the relevant regulations, by-laws, and decisions
 Proposing the projects of law related to the Ministry's functions
 Acting on regional and international cooperation with respect to judicial affairs
 Managing and investing orphans’ and underage properties so as to maintain them in accordance with the rules and procedures in this respect

List of ministers

Minister of Justice 

 Mohammed bin Ahmed al-Busaidi (1970-1972)

Minister of Interior and Justice 

 Sultan ibn Hamud (1972-1973) 
 Hilal ibn Hamad al-Sammar (1973-1984) [he would later be referred to as the Minister of Justice Awqaf & Islamic Affairs]

Minister of Justice Awqaf & Islamic Affairs 

Hilal bin Hamad al-Busaidi (1985-1991) 
Hamud bin 'Abdallah al-Harthi (1992-1998)

Minister of Justice 

Muhammad bin Abdallah bin Zahir al Hinai (1998-2012)
 Abd al-Malik bin Abdallah bin Ali al-Khalili (2012–present)

See also 
 Justice ministry
 Ministry of Legal Affairs (Oman)
 Politics of Oman

References 

Justice ministries
Government of Oman
1970 establishments in Oman